The Alamgir Mosque, Varanasi, Aurangzeb's Mosque, is situated in the Indian state of Uttar Pradesh.

Location
The mosque is located at a prominent site above the Panchaganga Ghat. The ghat has broad steps that go down to the Ganges.

Aurangzeb captured Varanasi in 1669 and destroyed the ancient Bindu Madhav temple and built a mosque on the ruins of the temple in 1673 and named it as Alamagir Mosque in the name of his own honorific title "Alamgir", which he had adopted after becoming the emperor of the Mughal empire.

The minarets couldn't withstand the test of time and in the 19th century, an English scholar James Prinsep had to restore them. In 1948 one of the minarets collapsed killing a few people around the time of the floods. Later the government pulled down the other minaret due to security reasons.

Features

The mosque is architecturally a blend of Islamic and Hindu architecture. The mosque has high domes and minarets. Two of its minarets were damaged; one minaret collapsed killing a few people and the other was officially brought down owing to stability concerns. The Panchaganga Ghat where the mosque is situated is where five streams are said to join. In October lamps are lighted on top of a bamboo staff as a mark of guidance to the ancestors.

References

Citations

Bibliography

Further reading

Mosques in Uttar Pradesh
Religious buildings and structures converted into mosques
Tourist attractions in Varanasi
17th-century mosques
Religion in Varanasi